Philippe-Andre Moreau (born July 9, 1970) is a Canadian former soccer player who played in the USL D-3 Pro League, and the Canadian Professional Soccer League.

Playing career 
Moreau began his professional career in the USL D-3 Pro League in 1997 with Albany Alleycats. His tenure with Albany lasted for two seasons, where in both seasons the club failed to reach a postseason berth. With Aibany he was named the MVP for the 1998 season and was named player of the week on four occasions. In 1999, he signed a contract with the Seacoast United Phantoms. With the Phantoms he helped the organization reach the final of the national championship, and clinch the Northern division title. In 2001, he signed with the Montreal Dynamites in the Canadian Professional Soccer League.

References 

1970 births
Living people
Albany Alleycats players
Association football midfielders
Canadian expatriate soccer players
Canadian Soccer League (1998–present) players
Canadian soccer players
Laval Dynamites players
People from Anjou, Quebec
Seacoast United Phantoms players
Soccer players from Montreal
USL Second Division players